Chinese privilege is the societal privilege that benefits Chinese people over other races in Singapore.  Sangeetha Thanapal, who is credited with coining the term by analogy to white privilege, defines Chinese privilege by stating that "by virtue of being Chinese in Singapore, you start life at a higher place compared to minorities."

Under the Singapore government's "Chinese-Malay-Indian-Other" (CMIO) model of race, those classified as Chinese form a numerical majority.  In New Mandala, Hydar Saharudin argues that Chinese privilege manifests in government policies including the Ethnic Integration Policy used to allocate government housing and the Group Representation Constituency system used to ensure racial balance and, by extension, "operationally guarantee Chinese political dominance".  Humairah Zainal argues that the People's Action Party's "race-based approach to politics inadvertently perpetuates Chinese privilege".

The extent and existence of Chinese privilege is controversial, since it challenges the government's line that Singapore is a meritocracy and to Chinese Singaporeans themselves "these 'privileges' remain mostly invisible".  Prime Minister Lee Hsien Loong in his National Day Rally in 2021 stated that "it is entirely baseless to claim that there is ‘Chinese privilege’ in Singapore", since Singapore treats "all races equally, with no special privileges", and Sangeetha was issued a stern warning by police for alleging that Singapore is a "Chinese supremacist state" on her Facebook page.

References

Critical race theory
Definition of racism controversy
Racism in Asia
Politics and race
Politics of Singapore
Social privilege
Social phenomena